Arslan Mehmed-paša (1745–1812), was a governor of the Ottoman Province of Bosnia from 29 April 1789 to 15 October 1789. He was also a serasker of Bosnia.

References 

 Prof. dr. Zaim Bilalbegović, "Porijeklo Porodice Bilajbegović" Čaplje, Sanski Most, 2010. Scribd
 Vedad Biščević, "Bosanski namjesnici Osmanskog doba (1463–1878)" Sarajevo, 2006. (304–305) Scribd

1745 births
1812 deaths
Ottoman governors of Bosnia
Bosnia and Herzegovina soldiers
Bosnian Muslims from the Ottoman Empire
Pashas